Bryan Warner Simonaire (born September 6, 1963) is an American politician who serves as a Maryland State Senator representing District 31, which encompasses much of northern Anne Arundel County's Baltimore suburbs.

Background
Bryan Simonaire was first elected to the Maryland State Senate in 2006 to represent District 31, which is a part of Anne Arundel County, Maryland.  He became the first Republican to ever win the State Senate seat in District 31.

In his most recent victory in 2014, he won with over 72% of the vote and a margin exceeding 17,000 votes.  In the 2010 election, Bryan Simonaire won the 2010 State Senate race by over 10,000 votes.  Comparatively, he only won by just over 600 votes in his first election in 2006.

The District 31 seat was long held by Democrat Philip C. Jimeno, who announced that he was retiring in 2006.  Simonaire defeated Democratic challenger Walter J. Shandrowsky in a tight race in the 2006 general election.  After trailing in initial vote counts on Election night, Simonaire pulled ahead when absentee ballots were counted.  In some parts of the state the Republican effort to get people to vote by absentee overturned some election night results.  In his first election, Simonaire won with just over 50% of the vote in a district that saw Republican affiliation grow by 22% in 4 years.  The Republican voter registration still only represents about 35% of the total registration in the district.

Education
Simonaire graduated from Bob Jones University in Greenville, South Carolina.  There he received his B.S. in computer science in 1985.  Simonaire returned to college to receive his M.S. in engineering science from Loyola College in Maryland, where he graduated in 2005. He has been a member of Upsilon Pi Epsilon, a computer science honor society, since 1993.

Career
After graduating from Bob Jones University, Simonaire worked as a computer systems engineer, for Westinghouse, where he worked until 1994.  In 1995, he took a position at Northrop Grumman as a senior systems engineer. (NOTE: This was likely due to Northrop Grumman's acquisition of Westinghouse and may or may not represent a job change.  See Northrop Grumman#History)

Simonaire was on the board of directors of the North County Republican Club for 2 years.  He is a member of the National Rifle Association (NRA), Chesapeake Bay Foundation (CBF), and he is the creator of Simonaire Santas for abused children, Young Heroes Essay Program that has seen thousands of elementary students participate, the co-founded of the annual Chesapeake Summit and the founder of Heroes-at-Home, a group that he started in 2002.

His daughter, Meagan Simonaire, was elected to the House of Delegates as a Republican from Anne Arundel County in 2014. In April 2018, she publicly broke with her father to support a bill banning conversion therapy for LGBT teens. In a speech on the House floor, she claimed her parents suggested conversion therapy after she came out to them. Simonaire disputed his daughter's story and continued to oppose the bill on the grounds that its definition of conversion therapy was too broad and would ban a "simple conversation." Simonaire offered an amendment to the bill to clarify the definition by adding “if it caused abuse or was coercive,” and claimed that he would have voted in support of the bill had the amendment been accepted. The bill was ultimately passed by both the House of Delegates and Senate. Simonaire maintains that he disagrees with his daughter's "lifestyle."

From October 2020 to November 2022, Simonaire served as the State Senate minority leader, replacing Sen. J.B. Jennings of Harford County.

Election results
2018 Race for Maryland State Senate – District 31
{| class="wikitable"
|-
!Name
!Votes
!Percent
!Outcome
|-
|-
|Bryan Simonaire, Rep.
|29,489
|  61.0%
|   Won
|-
|-
|Scott Harman, Dem.
|18,778
|  38.9%
|   Lost
|-
|Other Write-Ins
|61
|  0.1%
|   Lost
|}

2014 Race for Maryland State Senate – District 31
{| class="wikitable"
|-
!Name
!Votes
!Percent
!Outcome
|-
|-
|Bryan Simonaire, Rep.
|28,338
|  72.1%
|   Won
|-
|-
|Anthony Scott Harman, Dem.
|10,929
|  27.8%
|   Lost
|-
|Other Write-Ins
|34
|  0.1%
|   Lost
|}

2010 Race for Maryland State Senate – District 31
{| class="wikitable"
|-
!Name
!Votes
!Percent
!Outcome
|-
|-
|Bryan Simonaire, Rep.
|25,744
|  62.08%
|   Won
|-
|-
|Edward P. "Ned" Carey, Dem.
|15,688
|  37.83%
|   Lost
|-
|Other Write-Ins
|35
|  0.08%
|   Lost
|}

2006 Race for Maryland State Senate – District 31
{| class="wikitable"
|-
!Name
!Votes
!Percent
!Outcome
|-
|-
|Bryan Simonaire, Rep.
|19,516
|  50.8%
|   Won
|-
|-
|Walter J. Shandrowsky, Dem.
|18,857
|  49.1%
|   Lost
|-
|Other Write-Ins
|28
|  0.1%
|   Lost
|}

References

External links
 
 
 

1963 births
21st-century American politicians
Bob Jones University alumni
Computer systems engineers
Living people
Loyola University Maryland alumni
People from Anne Arundel County, Maryland
Politicians from Baltimore
Republican Party Maryland state senators